The E-mail Mystery is the 144th book in the Nancy Drew series. It was published in 1998 under the pseudonym Carolyn Keene.

Plot 
Nancy is the daughter of a lawyer. When someone starts making email maneuvers to take destabilize the law firm of her father, Nancy investigates the web to find the perpetrator.

Cover legend
"Nancy uncovers intrigue on the Internet... and the password is danger!"

References

Nancy Drew books
1998 American novels
1998 children's books
Novels about the Internet
Aladdin Paperbacks books